Tom Harrison (born 11 December 1971) is a British former professional cricketer and sports executive.  He played cricket with Northamptonshire and Derbyshire.

Harrison joined the England and Wales Cricket Board (ECB) as its new chief executive officer in January 2015.

Early life and education
Harrison was born in England. He was raised in South Africa until fourteen, after which he attended Oundle School, in Northamptonshire, followed by the University of Manchester.

Life and career
Harrison was Senior Vice President for the  sports agency, IMG, where he managed the company's media business in the UK and Ireland.  Prior to that, Harrison ran IMG's media business in the Indian sub-continent for two years.  He was also responsible for IMG's global cricket business and for global media rights sales for Cricket Australia, Cricket South Africa and the Indian Premier League.

Harrison spent five years living in Asia, working with the pan-Asian broadcaster and leading investors in global cricket rights, ESPN STAR Sports where he was responsible for rights syndication across all sports rights.  A former captain of Middlesex Premier League side, Teddington CC, Tom was previously ECB's Head of Marketing from 2003 to 2006. Harrison stepped down as CEO of the ECB in May 2022.

References

External links
Tom Harrison at Cricket Archive
Tom Harrison at BBC News

1971 births
Living people
Alumni of the University of Manchester
Chief Executives of the England and Wales Cricket Board
Derbyshire cricketers
English cricket administrators
English cricketers
Middlesex Cricket Board cricketers
People educated at Oundle School
Sportspeople from Peterborough